Bruto Testoni (1 July 1891 – 7 June 1949) was an Italian wrestler. He competed at the 1920 and the 1924 Summer Olympics. In the 1910s, Testoni won nine national titles in the light-heavyweight division.

References

External links
 

1891 births
1949 deaths
Olympic wrestlers of Italy
Wrestlers at the 1920 Summer Olympics
Wrestlers at the 1924 Summer Olympics
Italian male sport wrestlers
19th-century Italian people
20th-century Italian people